David Michael Coulter  is a Scottish karateka. Coulter was the winner of multiple World Karate Championships and European Karate Championships, in men's team kumite and men's −60 kg individual kumite.

References

Scottish male karateka
Sportspeople from Kilmarnock
Living people
1957 births
Members of the Order of the British Empire